Mangold v Helm (2005) C-144/04 was a case before the European Court of Justice (ECJ) about age discrimination in employment.

Facts
Mangold was a 56-year-old German man employed on a fixed term contract in a permanent full-time job. The German government introduced the so-called Employment Promotion Act 1996 which allowed fixed term contracts for a two-year maximum, and otherwise were unlawful unless they could be objectively justified. But even this protection was removed (apparently to "promote employment") if the employee was over 60. Further amendments then changed the age to 52. Mr Mangold claimed that the lack of protection, over age 52, was unjustified age discrimination.

Judgment
The ECJ held in its judgment the German law contravened the Employment Equality Framework Directive, even though it did not have to be implemented until the end of 2006. It said that, in general terms, legislation that lets employers treat people differently because of their age “offends the principle” in international law of eliminating discrimination on the basis of age. The ECJ ruled that national courts must set aside any provision of national law which conflicts with the directive even before the period for implementation has expired.

Significance
Because it recognised that equal treatment is a general principle of EU law, Mangold v Helm is significant for three critical reasons. First, it means that a claim for equal treatment is available for private citizens on a horizontal situation. It is not necessary to wait for a Directive to be implemented before making a claim to have caused discrimination. Second, it means that member state and EU legislation, like Directives, may be challenged on the ground that they fail to comply with the general principle of equal treatment. Third, because the court did not limit its remarks to the particular grounds of discrimination presently found in the equal treatment Directives (on sex, race, and disability, belief, sexual orientation and age) it follows that claims against discrimination on the basis of other characteristics may be possible (such as caste, education, property or military service). It would be likely to reflect the jurisprudence from the European Convention on Human Rights, where Article 14 which lists similar grounds to those already in the EU Directives but also adds "or other status".

See also

UK labour law
EU labour law

Notes

References
E McGaughey, A Casebook on Labour Law (Hart 2019) ch 15, 657

Anti-discrimination law in the European Union
European Union labour case law
Ageism case law